In Her Shoes may refer to:

In Her Shoes (novel), a 2002 novel by Jennifer Weiner
 In Her Shoes (film), a 2005 film starring Cameron Diaz, Toni Collette, Shirley MacLaine